Muireadhaigh is a Gaelic personal name derived from the word muir meaning sea, and thus coming to mean 'seaman', 'mariner' and also 'lord'. It is found as a patronym in the form of Ó Muireadhaigh and MacMuireadhaigh, which have been anglicised as Murray and Morrow in southwestern Scotland, northeastern Connacht and County Cavan. 

The name Morrow is found primarily in Donegal, Antrim, Down and Armagh which is due to Scottish settlement in those areas.

See also
 List of Irish-language given names

References

Gaelic-language given names